Dujakë is a village in the Gjakova municipality of Kosovo. It is located 8–10 km from Gjakova on the Gjakova-Peja highway.

Geography
Neighboring villages include Skivjan, Planqor, Hereq, Jasiq, Fieraj, and Novosellë. The village lies on flat terrain but borders a hill named Mujk to the west.

The river Krena runs through town. It has deepened over time and irrigates the adjoining farmland. A small concrete bridge joins the northern and southern parts of town across the river.

Demographics
The all-Albanian village's first inhabitants were from the Noci family, joined later by such families as the Muslija, Bushati, Alija, Gaxherri, Llolluni, Knushi, Frrokaj, Luli, Mazreku, and Shoshi, from such tribes as the Thaçi and the Berisha.

Both Muslims and Christians live here, though there is no mosque or church in town. The Muslims use the Skivjan mosque, while the Christians worship at the Plançor church.

The population has declined due largely to emigration.

Economy
The economy of Dujakë is supported largely by remittance from emigrants, including many in Switzerland, Germany, Austria, France, the Netherlands, and the United States. These funds support the individuals’ families as well as, more broadly, the national military and educational system and the village's infrastructure. On such project is a joint effort between the Gjakova Municipality and the Italian contingent of the NATO Kosovo Force toward sewer and road maintenance.

Agriculture in Dujakë has shifted from livestock sale to subsistence, given declining markets. Some service and manufacturing enterprises are active, including lumber.

Culture
Several cultural heritage sites as defined by the Republic of Kosovo government are in Dujakë, including the medieval archaeological site (no. 3654), Ahmet Islam's Tower (no. 1710), Arif Musa's Tower (no. 1709), and Sahit Avdyli's Tower (no. 1707).

Health and education
On Mujk Hill near town is the Fan Noli Primary School, attended by students from both Dujakë and Plançor. They go on to secondary and higher education in Gjakova and Pristina.

An ambulance destroyed during the Kosovo War has been restored to good condition and therefore still serves residents.

History
Dujakë has been inhabited since antiquity, and archaeological evidence was found during construction work on the farms and the highway. An Ottoman defter (tax record) from 1485 records the village, as discussed in Austrian historian Karl Kaser’s Der Mythos vom Wandervolk der Albaner: Landwirtschaft in den albanischen Gebieten. The following is noted:

The following is noted: Dujak (1485)~60 livestock~600 kg of flour or 60 acres taxed to the Ottoman Empire~79% plowed with corn~10% plowed with beans~while on the rest are cultivated wheat, barley, and grapes.

Additionally, during the 15th century, all of Dujakë's inhabitants had Albanian anthroponomy, indicating that Albanians inhabited the village and its surroundings.

Austrian historian Dr. Joseph Müller noted in 1844 that there were 40 Albanians living in Dujakë. However, by 1930, the League of Nations noted significant displacement during the Yugoslav colonization of Kosovo there. On March 3, 1945, a resident of Dujakë, Ahmet Sejd Nocaj, died in the 2-month liberation of the Drenica region from Axis occupation under the leadership of Shaban Polluzha.

Kosovo War
The villagers took up arms before the Kosovo War's formal outbreak, in 1997. Taking refuge during the NATO bombing of Yugoslavia, the population of Dujakë fled. The Catholics fled to the church in Novo Selo (Peć), but the Muslims were stopped on their way to the Skivjan mosque by paramilitaries, forcing them to escape across the Albanian border.

External links
 Geographical information

References

Villages in Gjakova